In Greek mythology, Isus (Ancient Greek: Ἶσόν) was a minor character mentioned in Homer's Iliad, one of the 50 sons of King Priam by an unidentified woman. He was killed by Agamemnon. Little is known of Isus other than brief mentions or relatives. He was known as a brother of Antiphus, son of Priam and Hecuba.

See also
 List of children of Priam

Notes

References 

 Homer, The Iliad with an English Translation by A.T. Murray, Ph.D. in two volumes. Cambridge, MA., Harvard University Press; London, William Heinemann, Ltd. 1924. Online version at the Perseus Digital Library.
 Homer, Homeri Opera in five volumes. Oxford, Oxford University Press. 1920. Greek text available at the Perseus Digital Library.

Trojans
Children of Priam
Princes in Greek mythology